Nicolas Wright (born March 23, 1982 in Montreal, Quebec) is a Canadian actor and writer. Wright has performed on stage, television and film. In 2004, he received the "most promising newcomer" award at the Just for Laughs film festival in Montreal for his short film, Toutouffe. Recently he appeared in Mike Clattenburg's 2011 film Afghan Luke. He appeared in 2016 film Independence Day: Resurgence.

Career
Nicolas began his career on film playing the lead role in the award-winning feature Hatley High (Best Director/Best Screenplay, Aspen Comedy Festival, Best Actor Nomination, ACTRA Awards 2006). Shortly after he co-starred in the BBC mini-series, Superstorm, with Tom Sizemore and Nicola Stephenson.  He also starred in the hit IFC mini-series, The Festival as well as its spin-off sequel The Business, which co-stars Kathleen Robertson. His work on the show earned him another Best Actor nomination at the 2007 ACTRA awards as well as a Gemini nomination for "Best ensemble performance in a comedy series." In 2007 he co-starred in MGM’s War Games: The Dead Code, Lifetime’s Girl's Best Friend alongside Janeane Garofalo, as well as PHILMS Pictures’ Prom Wars which co-stars Raviv Ullman and Alia Shawkat. The following year he costarred in the Canadian independent feature The Wild Hunt, which premiered at the Toronto International Film Festival where it was awarded "Best First Canadian Feature". In 2009 he co-starred in the CBS prime time comedy, Accidentally On Purpose with Jenna Elfman, Ashley Jensen, Grant Show and Jon Foster. The show earned a People’s Choice nomination in 2009 for "Best New Comedy". Later that year he starred in the Alliance Atlantis film, Afghan Luke alongside Nick Stahl. The film had its North American premiere at 2011 Toronto Film Festival. In 2012 he starred in Camera Shy, which premiered at the Vancouver International Film Festival.

Wright also writes and directs his own projects. His first short film Toutouffe was awarded "Special Jury Prize" at the Just For Laughs Comedia Film Festival. Since then he has developed television series with IFC and Comedy Central. A film he produced, wrote and starred in (Mike Clattenburg's short film Crackin' Down Hard) was awarded an honorable mention at the 2012 Toronto Film Festival and was also selected as part of TIFF’s Top Ten Films. Wright has appeared in the Columbia Pictures, Roland Emmerich-directed, feature film, White House Down (2013).

Nominations and awards
Nominated in 2003 for Best Actor at the Montreal Critic’s Circle for his starring role in an adaptation of The Picture of Dorian Gray, he won special mention as "the most promising newcomer" at the 2004 Montreal Comedy Festival Just for Laughs for his short film Toutouffe. In 2006, he shared a "Best Ensemble Performance in a Comedy Program or Series" nomination along with other members of the cast of the "Check Please" episode of The Business.

References

External links
 
  Nicolas Wright Bio at CBS.com

Living people
Canadian male film actors
Film directors from Montreal
Place of birth missing (living people)
Canadian male stage actors
Canadian male television actors
1982 births
Alumni of the British American Drama Academy
Male actors from Montreal